Yardley of London (usually referred to simply as Yardley or Yardleys) is a British personal care brand and one of the oldest firms in the world to specialise in cosmetics, fragrances and related toiletry products. Established in 1770, the company became a major producer of soap and perfumery by the beginning of the 20th century. 

By 1910, the company had moved to London's upmarket Bond Street, and Yardley received its first Royal Warrant in 1921. Today, the company holds two Royal Warrants. 

Since 2009, Yardley has been owned by Wipro, an Indian multinational conglomerate.

History
The company was established by the Cleaver family in 1770, which is the official date displayed on its product labels. According to the company's website, an earlier incarnation existed prior to this, but most records of the earlier company were lost in the Great Fire of London of 1666.

The company is named after William Yardley, who purchased the firm in 1823 from the sons of founder, Samuel Cleaver, who had gone into bankruptcy. The company became Yardley & Statham in 1841 when Charles Yardley, son of William, took on William Statham as a partner in the business. At the time, the business sold perfumes, soaps, powders, hair pomades and other toiletries.

In 1851, the company, which was still known as Yardley & Statham, exhibited at the Great Exhibition in The Crystal Palace. The same year, they changed their name to Yardley & Co. Yardley & Statham exhibited soap and perfume, including a soap called Old Brown Windsor, which was embossed with a picture of Windsor Castle and was one of their first production soaps.

In 1913, Yardley adopted Francis Wheatley's Flowersellers painting, from his Cries of London series, as their new corporate logo. The yellow primroses being sold in baskets in the painting, were replaced, in the logo, with sheaths of lavender.

Yardley's signature scent is English Lavender, which was launched in 1873. English Lavender was popular during the Victorian Era in England, and was exported to the USA in the 1880s, where it became popular in American households. 

The variety of lavender that Yardley uses in their products is Lavandula angustifolia, which is specially grown for Yardley in the South of England. Lavandula angustifolia was selected by the company in the 1930s, after a several year search for the finest variety.

Due to the growing popularity of Yardley soaps and cosmetics at the turn of the 20th century, the company opened a shop in 1910 on Bond Street in London. The original Yardley shop on Bond Street was at 8 New Bond Street, but it later moved to 33 Old Bond Street.

Yardley was acquired in 1967 by British American Tobacco (BAT). That same year, British model Twiggy became the face of Yardley. The company sold "Twiggy Eyelashes," "Twiggy Paint," and other cosmetics with her as the spokesmodel. Yardley became a symbol of Swinging London and was associated with the 1960s British youth culture of miniskirts, Carnaby Street and mod fashions.

In 1970, BAT organized its cosmetic businesses, which included Yardley, into British American Cosmetics. The cosmetics division was sold to Beecham Group in 1984. The following year, Yardley was sold to Wasserstein Perella & Co.

In 1991, Yardley introduced English Blazer, a range of men's grooming products.

In 1998, Yardley was placed into receivership after a year of marketing attempts to update its old-fashioned image. That same year, Yardley was acquired by Wella.

In 2005, Lornamead acquired Yardley for £60 million. In 2013, Li & Fung Group (now Fung Group) acquired Lornamead.

In 2009, Wipro Consumer Care and Lighting acquired Yardley from Lornamead for certain markets (Asia, Middle East, Australasia, as well as North and West Africa) for $45.5 million. In 2012, Wipro purchased the UK-European division from Lornamead, with the exception of Germany and Austria, where Lornamead remains the owner/rights holder.

In 2010, Bollywood actress Katrina Kaif was made the brand ambassador for Yardleys in India.

Royal Warrants
Yardley has had a long association with the British Royal Family and has been awarded the Royal Warrant of Appointment six times. The company has supplied several British monarchs with toiletries.
1921 – Edward, Prince of Wales; Perfumers and fine soap makers
1932 – Queen Mary; Perfumer
1949 – George VI; Purveyors of soap
1955 – Elizabeth II; Manufacturers of soap
1960 – Queen Elizabeth, The Queen Mother; Perfumers and manufacturers
1995 – Charles, Prince of Wales; Manufacturers of toilet preparations

See also
 David Montgomery, 2nd Viscount Montgomery of Alamein

References

External links

Official UK website – part of the Yardley markets owned by Wipro
Official US website – part of the Yardley markets owned by Lornamead
Lornamead website
History of Yardley

Wipro
History of cosmetics
Perfume houses
British Royal Warrant holders
British companies established in 1770
1770 establishments in England
Cosmetics companies of the United Kingdom
2012 mergers and acquisitions
Manufacturing companies established in 1770